The Easter Act 1928 (c. 35) is an Act of the Parliament of the United Kingdom passed and enacted in 1928 concerning the date for Easter that has never come into force. The effect would be to establish Easter Sunday as the Sunday following the second Saturday in April, resulting in Easter Sunday being between 9 April and 15 April, instead of following the established date for Easter as a moveable feast.

The Act requires the agreement (in the form of resolutions) of both the House of Commons and the House of Lords, before a commencement order is made by Order in Council. The Act also requires that before a draft order is submitted to Parliament, "regard shall be had to any opinion officially expressed by any Church or other Christian body”.

Although the subject has been raised occasionally in Parliament in the decades since, the Act has never been brought into force.

See also
Reform of the date of Easter

References

External links 

 House of Lords Hansard (Hansard), 11 March 1999, columns 455 et seq.: Easter Act 1928 (Commencement) Bill
 The Constitution Unit Blog: The Easter Act 1928: a date with history
 

1928 in Christianity
United Kingdom Acts of Parliament 1928
Easter date
Public holidays in the United Kingdom